William Knott was an association football player who represented New Zealand, playing in New Zealand's first ever official international.

Knott scored in New Zealand's inaugural A-international fixture, with Ted Cook scoring a brace as New Zealand beat Australia 3–1 on 17 June 1922. It was his only appearance in official internationals.

References 

Year of birth missing
Year of death missing
New Zealand association footballers
New Zealand international footballers
Association footballers not categorized by position